Alison Dunlap (born July 27, 1969) is an American professional cyclist. She won the world cross-country mountain bike championship in 2001 and two Mountain Bike World Cup races. She also won the Redlands Bicycle Classic on the road in 1996.

Dunlap represented the United States in the road race at the 1996 Summer Olympics and the cross-country mountain bike event at the 2000 Summer Olympics.

Major achievements 
 UCI Tissot Mountain Bike World Cup Champion (2002)
 UCI Mountain Bike Cross Country (XC) World Champion (2001)
 Olympic Games 2000: mountain bike, 7th
 Olympic Games 1996: road race
 Pan American Games: gold medallist (cross country): (1999)
 3x  National cross-country champion: (1999, 2002, 2004)
 3x  National short-track cross-country champion: (1999, 2002, 2004)
 6x  National cyclo-cross champion: (1997, 1998, 1999, 2000, 2001, 2003)
  National Road and Omnium Collegiate champion: (1991)
 U.S. Olympic Festival gold medallist (road race) (1993)
 UCI Tissot World Cup: 2nd overall (2000)
 8x World Mountain Bike Championship: (1994, 1997, 1998, 1999, 2000, 2001, 2002, 2004)
 World Road Cycling Championships: 1993–94 (bronze), (1998–99)
 World Cyclo-Cross Championships: 2004 (5th), 2002 (4th), 2000 (7th)
 UCI World Cup wins (mtb): two (cross-country); one in cyclo-cross (2002)
 Finished on the podium (top 5) in all UCI World Cup races (2000, 2002)
 National race wins: eight (cross-country), fourteen (short-track cross-country)
 Sea Otter Classic: 1st overall (1999, 2002, 2003, 2004); stage winner (1999–2004)
 Hewlett Packard International Women's Challenge (road) stage winner: (1993, 1996, 1997, 2001)
 Redlands Cycling Classic (road) 1st overall, one stage win: (2000, 1996)
 Tour of Willamette (road) 1st overall, two stage wins: (2001)
 Iceman Cometh Challenge 1st place (2009)

Accolades 
 Colorado Springs Sports Hall of Fame Inductee (2003)
 VeloNews North American Female Cyclist of the Year (2002, 1999)
 Bicycle Retailer and Industry News Female Athlete of the Year (2002)
 Colorado Sports Hall of Fame Amateur Athlete of the Year (2001)
 Colorado Sportswoman of the Year (2001)
 Colorado Springs Gazette Telegraph Athlete of the Year (2001)
 Colorado College Athletic Hall of Fame Inductee (2000).
 Named to the Top Ten Greatest Colorado Female Athletes of All Time by the Denver Post (1999)
 U.S. Olympic Committee Athlete of the Month (June 1997, December 1999, - December 2000, September 2001)
 USA Cycling's nominee for 1998, 1999 and 2001 USOC SportsWoman of the Year
 USA Cycling's nominee for the 2001 James E. Sullivan Award
 Three-time VISA/USA Cycling Elite Mountain Bike Female Athlete of the Year (1997, 1998, 1999)
 US Collegiate Road Champion (1991) and Overall Omnium Champion (1991)

Education
Dunlap was the 1987 valedictorian at Smoky Hill High School. She gained a bachelor's degree in biology in 1991 at Colorado College.

Personal life
Dunlap was born in Denver, Colorado, and is married to the cyclist Greg Frozley. She has a child, Emmett, born on October 26, 2010.

References

External links
 Alison Dunlap's web site
 
 

1969 births
Living people
American female cyclists
Cross-country mountain bikers
Cyclists at the 1996 Summer Olympics
Cyclists at the 1999 Pan American Games
Cyclists at the 2000 Summer Olympics
Olympic cyclists of the United States
Sportspeople from Denver
UCI Mountain Bike World Champions (women)
Pan American Games medalists in cycling
Pan American Games gold medalists for the United States
American mountain bikers
American cyclo-cross champions
Medalists at the 1999 Pan American Games
21st-century American women
Cyclo-cross cyclists
20th-century American women